"Don't Burn the Candle at Both Ends" is a song written by Benny Carter, Irving Gordon, and Louis Jordan. It was performed by Louis Jordan and his Tympany Five, recorded in December 1947 and released on the Decca label (catalog no. 24483-A). The "B" side of the record was "We Can't Agree".

The song peaked at No. 4 on Billboards race record chart.  It was ranked No. 21 on the magazine's list of the top-selling race records of 1948.

See also
 Billboard Top Race Records of 1948

References

1948 songs
Louis Jordan songs
Songs written by Louis Jordan
Songs written by Irving Gordon